TMCA may refer to:

 Tauro-muricholic acid, a type of bile acid
 The Medical Center of Aurora, in Aurora, Colorado
 Total Museum of Contemporary Art, in Seoul, South Korea
 Toyota Motor Corporation Australia, a subsidiary of Toyota Motor Corporation
 TRNAMet cytidine acetyltransferase (TmcA), an enzyme
 Tsing Ma Control Area, a subdivision of Hong Kong